Casa Diablo is a location in the Sierra Nevada in Mono County, eastern California, United States.  Casa Diablo Hot Springs was named “House of the Devil”, by early explorers, for its boiling hot springs, rising steam and geysers.

Native settlement
This locale is noted as a Native American mining and manufacturing site specializing in obsidian materials. Use of materials from this site is noted at least as early as the Millingstone Horizon. Peoples as distant as the coastal Chumash people traded for material from this Obsidian source.

Later settlements
It was a relay station for the route to the mining camps of Mammoth City, Mill City, Mineral Peak and Pine City. In 1881, Casa Diablo stage station ceased operating and was later used for other business as a trading post, a seasonal resort, a tavern, a gas station, a grocery store, a hardware store and a lumber yard. In 1983, it was transformed into a geothermal electric generating plant.

See also
 Mono tribe
 Projectile point
 Obsidian hydration

Notes

References
 Kathleen L. Hull (2001) Reasserting the Utility of Obsidian Hydration Dating: A Temperature-Dependent Empirical Approach to Practical Temporal Resolution with Archaeological Obsidians, Academic Press.
 C.Michael Hogan (2008) Morro Creek, The Megalithic Portal, ed. by A. Burnham 

Ghost towns in California
Geography of Mono County, California
Sierra Nevada (United States)
History of Mono County, California
Mono tribe
Native American history of California
Archaeological sites in California
Chumash
Former settlements in Mono County, California
Populated places established in 1878
1878 establishments in California